Motiur Rohman Mondal is an Indian politician and physician. He was elected to the Assam Legislative Assembly from Mankachar in the 2016 Assam Legislative Assembly election. He previously served from 2006 to 2011.

References

Independent politicians in India
People from Dhubri district
1960 births
Living people
Cotton College, Guwahati alumni
Indian National Congress politicians
Indian National Congress politicians from Assam
Assam MLAs 2006–2011
Assam MLAs 2016–2021